Brian S. King is an American politician serving as a Democratic member of the Utah House of Representatives from the 23rd district. Before redistricting following the 2020 Census, he represented the 28th district since January 1, 2009.

Education
King earned a Bachelor of Science degree in economics from the University of Utah and a Juris Doctor from the S.J. Quinney College of Law.

Career 
King works as a self-employed lawyer, providing legal services in the field of ERISA and MHPAEA litigation. He has spoken prominently on the positive benefits of residential treatment centers in addressing mental health problem in youth.

Utah Legislature 
In 2008, when Representative Roz McGee left the Legislature and left the seat open, King was unopposed after an opponent withdrew, and won the three-way November 4, 2008 general election with 8,487 votes (56.2%) against Republican nominee Jeffrey Morrow and Constitution candidate Jared Beck, who had run for Utah State Senate in 2006.

House minority leader 
King had the reputation as being "more combative" than previous minority leaders in the State House of Representatives. In 2016, King criticized Republican leadership of the House for "shut(ing) out Democrats from discussions about whether to expand Medicaid for the poor." He was succeeded in 2023 by Angela Romero.

Committee assignments 
During the 2016 legislative session, King served on the Executive Appropriations Committee, the Executive Offices and Criminal Justice Appropriations Subcommittee, the House Judiciary Committee, the House Revenue and Taxation Committee, and the House Rules Committee. He also served as the House minority leader. In the 2022 legislative session, King served on the Executive Appropriations Committee, the Federalism Commission, the House Business and Labor Committee, the House Judiciary Committee, the House Legislative Expense Oversight Committee, the Legislative Audit Subcommittee, the Legislative Management Committee, Natural Resources, Agriculture, and Environmental Quality Appropriations Subcommittee, and the Subcommittee on Oversight.

Gun policy 
Throughout his career, King has sponsored gun control legislation. In 2019, King sponsored HB 148, "Universal Background Checks for Firearm Purchasers" that would require background checks for all gun sales, but it was not given a committee vote. In 2020, King sponsored his and it was tabled by the House Law Enforcement and Criminal Justice Committee by an 8–3 vote. In 2022, King sponsored a modified version of the bill previously sponsored, which would require background checks for all non-federal firearms licensees, law enforcement agencies and officers and family members as exceptions. The House Law Enforcement and Criminal Justice Committee rejected the bill on an 8–3 vote.

Elections

2020: King was unopposed in the Democratic primary, but faced Republican challenger Carol Hunter in the general election. King won the race with 71.9% of the vote.
2018: King was unopposed in the Democratic primary and general election, winning with 16,494 votes (100%).
2016: King was unopposed in the Democratic primary and general election.
2014: King was unopposed in the Democratic primary and general election, winning with 9,960 votes (100%).
2012: King was unopposed for the June 26, 2012 Democratic primary and won the November 6, 2012 general election with 12,530 votes (67.2%) against Republican nominee Rick Raile, who had run for a House seat in 2010.
2010: King was unopposed for the June 22, 2010 Democratic primary and won the November 2, 2010 general election with 6,703 votes (59.9%) against Republican nominee James Farley.

Personal life 
He is a member of the Church of Jesus Christ of Latter-day Saints and served a full-time mission in St. Louis Missouri.

References

External links
Official page at the Utah State Legislature
Campaign site

Brian King at Ballotpedia
Brian S. King at the National Institute on Money in State Politics

1959 births
21st-century American politicians
Latter Day Saints from Utah
Living people
Democratic Party members of the Utah House of Representatives
Place of birth missing (living people)
Politicians from Salt Lake City
S.J. Quinney College of Law alumni
University of Utah alumni
Utah lawyers